Eldur Parder (10 August 1928 Tartu – 30 May 2003) was an Estonian politician. He was a member of VIII Riigikogu.

References

1928 births
2003 deaths
Members of the Riigikogu, 1995–1999
Voters of the Estonian restoration of Independence
Gulag detainees
Prisoners and detainees of the Soviet Union
Tallinn University of Technology alumni
Politicians from Tartu